Steven James Zahn (born November 13, 1967) is an American actor and comedian. His film roles include Reality Bites (1994), Stuart Little (1999), Shattered Glass (2003), Sahara (2005), Chicken Little (2005), the Diary of a Wimpy Kid series (2010–2012), Dallas Buyers Club (2013), The Good Dinosaur (2015), and War for the Planet of the Apes (2017). On television, Zahn appeared as Davis McAlary on HBO's Treme (2010–2013), and as Mark Mossbacher in the first season of the HBO satire comedy miniseries The White Lotus (2021), for which he was nominated for the Primetime Emmy Award for Outstanding Supporting Actor in a Limited or Anthology Series or Movie. He won the Independent Spirit Award for Best Supporting Male for his performance in the film Happy, Texas (1999).

Early life
Zahn was born in Marshall, Minnesota, the son of Carleton Edward Zahn, a Lutheran minister, and Zelda Clair Zahn, a bookstore clerk and later a YMCA administrator. His father is of German and Swedish descent, and his mother is of German ancestry. Zahn spent part of his childhood in Mankato, Minnesota, attending Kennedy Elementary School, and moved to the suburbs of Minneapolis for high school, where he acted in school plays and became a two-time Minnesota state speech champion. He graduated from Robbinsdale Cooper High School in 1986, planning eventually to join the United States Marine Corps.

Zahn attended Gustavus Adolphus College for one semester but dropped out after seeing the original West End production of Les Misérables. "I remember sitting through the second act thinking, I'm as good as that guy standing on the barricade," Zahn recalled. "I wanted to be part of the circus." Zahn later enrolled in the Institute for Advanced Theater Training at Harvard University, earning a Master of Fine Arts.

Career 
In 1991, Zahn made his professional stage debut in a Minnesota production of Neil Simon's Biloxi Blues after falsely claiming to be a member of Actors' Equity. His fellow actors suggested that Zahn study acting, inspiring him to enroll in American Repertory Theater's two-year training program. At A.R.T., he worked with the stage director Andrei Șerban.

In 1991, Zahn formed the Malaparte theater company with a group of actor friends, including Ethan Hawke and Robert Sean Leonard. From 1991 to 1992, he played Hugo Peabody in a national tour of Bye Bye Birdie starring Tommy Tune, and subsequently appeared in two Off-Broadway plays, Sophistry and Eric Bogosian's Suburbia.

After his breakout film role in 1994's Reality Bites, Zahn quickly gained a reputation for playing amiable stoners, slackers, and sidekicks in films such as That Thing You Do! (1996), You've Got Mail (1998), and Out of Sight (1998). In the 1990s, Zahn was often approached by fans who assumed that he was an archetypal Generation X slacker, which was not the case. He has said, "I'm the guy who gets up at six without an alarm clock. I was always that guy."

In 1999, Zahn landed his first starring role in the critically acclaimed indie film Happy, Texas, for which he won a Special Jury Award at the Sundance Film Festival. In the wake of Happy, Texas, Zahn began playing darker, more nuanced characters. He received Oscar buzz for his role as Drew Barrymore's deadbeat ex in Riding in Cars with Boys (2001), and played investigative journalist Adam Penenberg in Shattered Glass (2003). A longtime Werner Herzog fan, Zahn campaigned for the role of Vietnam prisoner of war Duane W. Martin in Herzog's 2007 film Rescue Dawn; to prepare for the role, he lost 40 pounds by eating mostly raw food.

Zahn has also worked regularly in television, playing the role of Davis McClary on 36 episodes of HBO's Treme.

In 2017, Zahn played Bad Ape in War for the Planet of the Apes. He researched the role by watching chimpanzee videos on YouTube, and later said that the motion capture process and lengthy digital takes made Bad Ape "the most challenging acting job I've ever had".

Personal life
Zahn met author and theater artist Robyn Peterman, the daughter of clothier J. Peterman, while they were performing in a national tour of Bye Bye Birdie in 1991. The couple married in 1994 and have two children. In the 1990s, they bought a cabin in Pennsylvania and then a farm in New Jersey, near the Delaware Water Gap. They next moved to a 360-acre horse farm outside Lexington, Kentucky, where Zahn gardens and raises horses, goats, and sheep. He and his wife also run a local community theater, in which Zahn occasionally performs. He also has a lake cabin near Pine City, Minnesota, where he enjoys tubing and fishing with his two children. He is a Lutheran.

Zahn is a lifelong military history buff and has said that one of his biggest regrets was having turned down a role in the HBO miniseries Band of Brothers. In 2007, he was awarded an honorary Ph.D. in Fine Arts from Northern Kentucky University. A University of Kentucky sports fan, Zahn is often seen at games and events.

Filmography

Film

Television

Video games

Theatre

References

External links

 
 

1967 births
20th-century American male actors
21st-century American male actors
American Lutherans
American male comedians
American male film actors
American male television actors
American male voice actors
American people of German descent
American people of Swedish descent
Gustavus Adolphus College alumni
Independent Spirit Award for Best Supporting Male winners
Institute for Advanced Theater Training, Harvard University alumni
Living people
Male actors from Minnesota
Northern Kentucky University alumni
People from Georgetown, Kentucky
People from Marshall, Minnesota